Mazār-e-Qāsmi, also Qabristān-e-Qāsmi is a cemetery located in the premises of Darul Uloom Deoband where notable Deobandi scholars are buried.

Notable interments

 Muhammad Qasim Nanautavi (died 1880)
 Mahmud Hasan Deobandi (died  1920)
 Aziz-ul-Rahman Usmani (died 1928)
 Izaz Ali Amrohi (died 1955)
 Hussain Ahmad Madani (died 1957)
 Asad Madni (died 2006)
 Kafilur Rahman Nishat Usmani (died 2006)
 Abdul Haq Azmi (died 2016)
 Ghulam Nabi Kashmiri (died 2019)
 Muhammad Salim Qasmi (died 2018).
 Noor Alam Khalil Amini (died 2021)
 Abdul Khaliq Sambhali (died 2021)

References

Darul Uloom Deoband